This is a list of films produced in mainland China ordered by year of release in 2000. For an alphabetical listing of Chinese films see :Category:Chinese films

See also
 Cinema of China
 2000 in China
 Best 100 Chinese Motion Pictures as chosen by the 24th Hong Kong Film Awards

References

External links
 IMDb list of Chinese films

Chinese
Films
2000